Bahati is a constituency of the National Assembly of Zambia. It covers the northern part of Mansa and a rural area to the north of the city in Mansa District of Luapula Province.

List of MPs

Election results

2019

References

Constituencies of the National Assembly of Zambia
1973 establishments in Zambia
Constituencies established in 1973